Richard Jones CBE (born 7 June 1953) is a British theatre and opera director. He was born in London, and studied at the University of Hull and University of London.  After working as a jazz musician, he spent 1982–83 on a bursary working with Scottish Opera and the Citizens Theatre.

His work has become controversial and has provoked considerable reactions from the UK press.  However, he is also seen as a major figure in the worlds of theatre and opera, as has been noted in a 2002 interview which appeared in London's The Guardian:
 [His] gift for the thrilling, the gaudy and the wayward is one of the characteristics that marks Jones out. "He is the best British director around at the moment," says director David Pountney, part of the "powerhouse" triumvirate that presided over English National Opera in the 1980s. "He is extremely imaginative, he has a very individual, quirky response to the material, and a very sharp eye for humour."

Professional career

Opera
Jones's earliest productions were for the Batignano Festival, Opera Northern Ireland and Opera 80, now English Touring Opera.  He came to prominence in 1987 with the world première of Judith Weir's A Night at the Chinese Opera for Kent Opera and a production of Mignon at the Wexford Festival. Overall, he has worked for a wide range of well-known opera companies, including directing five productions for the Royal Opera House, Covent Garden; Lohengrin (Munich) and Skin Deep for Opera North, Copenhagen, and Bregenz); several for the Glyndebourne Festival; two for Frankfurt Opera; productions for Brussels as well as the Olivier Award-winning Hansel and Gretelfor Welsh National Opera.  Operas ranging from Cavalleria Rusticana and Pagliacci to From Morning to Midnight, The Bitter Tears of Petra von Kant and The Love for Three Oranges appeared on the stage of English National Opera while  Pelleas and Melisande was presented for both Opera North and ENO in 1995. This production was described as "one of Jones's unalloyed successes", while his 1993 Ring Cycle at Covent Garden came in for much criticism: "[it] was greeted with bemusement, even contempt: one paper called it "a monument of garish flippancy and banal cartoon caricature". "The audience's catcalls on the first night of Das Rheingold made front-page news" noted Charlotte Higgins in her 2002 interview with the director, and a photo of the Rhinemaidens in fat suits even made the front page of the Sun newspaper. As a result, ENO's decision to entrust Jones with their new Ring Cycle in 2021 "raised some eyebrows", according to Nicholas Kenyon's review in the Telegraph. In the event, reviews of The Valkyrie (with which the cycle opened) were almost unanimously hostile to the production.

He has directed for Amsterdam and Munich, while L'enfant et les sortilèges appeared on the Paris Opera stage. The summer festival at Bregenz featured large-scale productions of Un ballo in maschera and La bohème. Berg's Wozzeck was staged in Berlin and at Welsh National Opera.

In 2013, Jones directed the production of Benjamin Britten's opera Gloriana at The Royal Opera House in London for the centennial of Britten's birth. Additionally, the American premiere of the opera Anna Nicole was presented by New York City Opera in September, a revival of his original production at The Royal Opera House at Covent Garden.

The theatre
Theatre work includes five productions for the Young Vic in London and which range from The Government Inspector to Annie Get Your Gun. Black Snow was directed for the American Repertory Theatre, plus All's Well That Ends Well for the Public Theater in New York. In London, Holy Mothers was presented at the Ambassadors and the Royal Court Theatre, while 
La Bête was seen in London's West End and on Broadway, where it received a Tony nomination.  On Broadway, Jones' productions of the Maury Yeston Tony Award-winning Best Musical Titanic and Wrong Mountain were presented.
 For the Royal Shakespeare Company, Jones directed A Midsummer Night's Dream, which provoked critical reactions such as the comments "Dream world ruined by this vandal's romp" and "Miserably undercast, grotesquely overdesigned, sloppily directed and lacks the following: theatricality, comedy and magic" which appeared as part of The Guardians interview.  Higgins also notes that the production "is now generally known as the play that got the worst reviews of the RSC's entire history and of any theatre production for the past 20 years.

Le Bourgeois Gentilhomme and Tales from the Vienna Woods by Odon von Horvath—in a new version by David Harrower—were presented by the National Theatre in London.

Recent years
In 2011, Jones directed David Harrower's Government Inspector (after Gogol's Revisor of 1836) at Warwick Arts Centre and London's Young Vic Theatre; the production featured Julian Barratt and Doon Mackichan.

Additionally, Offenbach's opera, Les contes d'Hoffmann, was directed for the Bavarian State Opera in Munich. This production concentrated on the poet's state of mind, intensified by drinking and pipe-smoking. All three loves occupied physically similar spaces, as if their tales existed only in Hoffmann's imagination. Rolando Villazón sang Hoffmann, having returned to vocal form after difficulties, and Diana Damrau took the roles of Olympia, Antonia, Giulietta and, mutely, Stella. It was conducted by Constantinos Carydis.
 The production was also noteworthy for Angela Brower's portrayal of the leading role of Nicklausse, Hoffmann's constant companion. English National Opera co-commissioned the staging, which received negative reviews along with the good, provoking this response in Britain's Opera magazine:
Of course there were striking elements in Jones’s direction—there always are—his handling of the doll for one, and the effect of the rose-tinted spectacles, which he didn’t follow through consistently. I was less sure of King Kong watching the Antonia act from the floats, and joining in Giulietta’s entourage. And as of now the Giulietta act is a mess. In sum, the Jones Hoffmann is too abstract, too loose of focus, and far too long. Perhaps Kaye-Keck could be persuaded to turn their minds to an ‘authentic’ opéra comique edition. 
Other reviews took different approaches.

Awards

Production History

References
Notes

Sources
Adam, Nicky (ed.) (1993), Who's Who in British Opera London: Scolar Press. 
Higgins, Charlotte, "Rise of the Demon King", The Guardian (London), 20 April 2002. (Profile of Jones)

External links
Official website of Richard Jones
 

British opera directors
Theatre people from London
Alumni of the University of Hull
Alumni of the University of London
1953 births
Living people
British theatre directors
Commanders of the Order of the British Empire